Halvai may refer to:
 Halvai 1, Hormozgan Province
 Halvai 2, Hormozgan Province
 Halvai 3, Hormozgan Province
 Halvai, Razavi Khorasan
 Halvai, South Khorasan